Arizona Business Gazette is a business newspaper in Phoenix, Arizona owed by Gannett Company not to be confused with the Arizona Gazette which is owned by Cody Agency, LLC. The Arizona Business Gazette is a spin-off of The Arizona Republic, it was downsized in 1997, and now mainly focuses on real-estate and local business news. It has a circulation of 1,208.

References

External links
 abgnews.com

Mass media in Phoenix, Arizona
Newspapers published in Arizona